The Brothers Karamazov is a novel by Fyodor Dostoevsky.

The Brothers Karamazov may also refer to:
 Die Brüder Karamasoff (1922), a German film based on the novel
  (I fratelli Karamazoff), an Italian film by Giacomo Gentilomo
 The Brothers Karamazov (1958 film), an American film based on the novel
 The Brothers Karamazov (1969 film), a Soviet film based on the novel
 The Karamazov Brothers (film), a 2008 Czech film based on the novel
 , a Russian television series (8x52 minutes) based on the novel

See also
The Flying Karamazov Brothers, a juggling troupe